Diana Harding may refer to:

Diana Harding, character in Forbidden (1949 film)
Dido Harding, Diana Harding, businesswoman
Diana Harding, Natural Law candidate for Hemel Hempstead (UK Parliament constituency)